The governor of Cavite is the local chief executive of the Province of Cavite in the Philippines.

List of governors of Cavite

The following is the list of governors of Cavite from the creation of the politico-military province of Cavite in 1614 during the Spanish colonial era to the present Republic of the Philippines:

References

 
Governors of provinces of the Philippines